Mehdi Davatghari (born 1966) is an Iranian lawyer and politician.

Davatghari was born in Maragheh. He is a member of the present Islamic Consultative Assembly from the electorate of Maragheh and Ajabshir. Davatghari won with 92,215 (60.35%) votes.

References

People from Maragheh
Deputies of Maragheh and Ajabshir
20th-century Iranian lawyers
Living people
1966 births
Members of the 9th Islamic Consultative Assembly
Followers of Wilayat fraction members